The 1980 United States presidential election in Connecticut took place on November 4, 1980. All 50 states and The District of Columbia, were part of the 1980 United States presidential election. Voters chose eight electors to the Electoral College, who voted for president and vice president.

Connecticut was won by former California Governor Ronald Reagan by 10 points. 
President of the United States Jimmy Carter failed to gain reelection against Reagan. Connecticut election results reflect the Republican Party's re-consolidation under what is popularly called the "Reagan Revolution," which sounded overwhelming conservative electoral victories across the United States.

The already embattled incumbent Democratic president Carter was hurt in the state by the strong third party candidacy of John Anderson, a liberal Republican Congressman who ran in 1980 as an independent after failing to win the Republican Party's own presidential nomination. Anderson proved very popular with liberal and moderate voters in New England who normally leaned Democratic but were dissatisfied with the policies of the Carter Administration and viewed Reagan as too far to the right. New England overall would prove to be Anderson's strongest region in the nation, with all 6 New England states giving double-digit percentages to Anderson. In fact, Connecticut would prove to be Anderson's fifth strongest state in the nation after Massachusetts, Vermont, Rhode Island and New Hampshire. His 12.22% of the vote in the state was nearly double the 6.61% he got nationwide.

Despite Reagan's win in Connecticut, the Nutmeg State voted 0.11% more Democratic than the nation-at-large. As of 2022, this is the most recent election that Connecticut voted more Republican than the Southern states of Alabama, Louisiana, Mississippi, North Carolina, and South Carolina.

Results

By county

See also
 United States presidential elections in Connecticut

References

Connecticut
1980
1980 Connecticut elections